"Who's That Man" is a song written and recorded by American country music singer Toby Keith. It was released in July 1994 as the first single from his 1994 album Boomtown. The song became Keith's second number one hit on the US Billboard Hot Country Singles & Tracks (now Hot Country Songs) chart.

Content
The narrator discusses returning to the home in which he used to reside. His ex-wife, children and their family dog still live in the residence, but the wife's new husband has now taken the place of the narrator.

Music video
The music video for this song was directed by Marc Ball, and premiered on CMT on July 21, 1994. It features Keith driving in an old neighborhood, and singing and playing guitar in a dark room. Throughout the video, a man, woman and children are seen playing outside.

Chart performance
"Who's That Man" debuted at number 74 on the country chart dated July 30, 1994. It charted for 20 weeks on that chart, and became Keith's second Number One on the chart dated October 8, 1994, holding that position for one week.

Charts

Year-end charts

References

1994 singles
Toby Keith songs
Songs written by Toby Keith
Song recordings produced by Harold Shedd
Polydor Records singles
1994 songs